Jonathan Wahl is a mathematician based at the University of North Carolina at Chapel Hill.

Wahl received his Ph.D. from Harvard University in 1971 under the supervision of David Mumford.  He earned a B.S. from Yale University in 1965 and M.A. from Yale in 1965.

In 2012, Wahl became a fellow of the American Mathematical Society. He is managing editor of the Duke Mathematical Journal.

References

Year of birth missing (living people)
Living people
20th-century American mathematicians
Fellows of the American Mathematical Society
Harvard University alumni
University of North Carolina at Chapel Hill faculty
Yale University alumni
Algebraic geometers
21st-century American mathematicians